Darroll DeLaPorte (October 30, 1903 – December 25, 1980) was a player in the National Football League. He attended South Division High School and St. John's Military Academy. He was a member of the Milwaukee Badgers during the 1925 NFL season.

References

1903 births
1980 deaths
Sportspeople from Green Bay, Wisconsin
Players of American football from Wisconsin
American football fullbacks
Milwaukee Badgers players
South Division High School alumni